This is a list of lighthouses in Greece'''.

Lighthouses

See also
 Lists of lighthouses and lightvessels

References

External links

 
Lighthouses of Greece
List of Greek lighthouses that are historical structures		
 
 
 
 
 

Greece

Lighthouses
Lighthouses